Albert Ernest Monk CMG (16 September 1900 – 11 February 1975) was an Australian trade unionist who was best known for his work with the Australian Council of Trade Unions (ACTU). He was president from 1934 to 1943, secretary from 1943 to 1949, and then president again from 1949 to 1969.

In 1966 he was appointed a Companion of the Order of St Michael and St George.

Writer Blanche d'Alpuget had intended to write a biography of Monk but was refused permission by Monk's widow, as she did not want the public to know that she was Monk's second wife.

D'Alpuget instead wrote a biography of Monk's successor as ACTU President and future Prime Minister Bob Hawke, whom she married in 1995.

References

External links 
 Australian Dictionary of Biography

1900 births
1975 deaths
Australian trade unionists
English emigrants to Australia
People from Waltham Abbey, Essex
Australian Companions of the Order of St Michael and St George